Laert Vasili (Laertis Vasiliou; born 7 March 1974) is a Greek-Albanian actor and director of film and stage.

Background
From his father's side, Vasili is of Albanian descent while his mother is Greek. Both of his parents were officers in the Military of Albania. As a result, the family moved around a lot and he spent his childhood between Tirana, Saranda and Delvina, Albania. He started acting at the age of 16 while still in high school, playing leading parts in several school theatre performances. At the age of 19 he was accepted to the Academy of Arts in Tirana. In 1994 he left for Greece in order to study acting at the National Theatre of Greece Drama School in Athens, Greece. He came second out of 750 applicants. He graduated in 1997.

Corpus Christi controversy
Vasili directed a play Corpus Christi in Greece that depicts Jesus Christ and his apostles as a group of homosexual men. The 1997 play was written by American playwright Terrence McNally. The Greek Orthodox Church and the right-wing extremist Golden Dawn protested against the play. The director and actors of the play faced charges of blasphemy in Greece. Vasiliou said that prosecutors were misdirecting scarce resources by pursuing his cast, rather than trying to nab tax evaders who have plunged Greece into ruin. "What I see is that there are people who have robbed the country blind, who are not in jail, and the prosecutor turns against art," Vasili told Reuters.

Awards 
 Best Director Award at International Theatre Festival in Prespa 2021
 Citizen of Honour
 Actor of Europe Award at International Theatre Festival Lake Without Borders 2018
 Best Director of the Year at Pegasi International Awards 2015
 Special Award for Corpus Christi at Athens Queer Theatre Award 2012
 Most Important Theatre Artist of the Year 2008 by Eleftherotypia
 Mess Future Prize at Mess Sarajevo International Theatre Festival 2008
 Best Director Prize at Balkan Theatre Festival 2005

Nominations
 Best Director Prize 2016] by Kult Awards
 Man of the Year 2012 by LIFO
 Best Director Prize 2008 by Athinorama People's Choice Theatre Awards
 Best Young Actor Prize 2002

Director
He has written and directed theatrical plays dealing with the sensitive theme of immigration and the notion of being a foreigner. He was the first to use Albanian artists living in Greece in professional performances, which moreover were multi-lingual. The plays were initially presented in Athens, Greece, and run for more than 400 performances from 2003 to 2015, in Greece, Cyprus, Bosnia and Herzegovina, Macedonia, Kosovo and in Albania.

Electra by Sophocles at Buthrotum
Doruntine, by Ismail Kadare
Agamemnon Inferno, by Ismail Kadare
Corpus Christi by Terrence McNally
The Emigrants by Sławomir Mrożek
Love songs with ravens by Bashkim Hoxha
I remember… by Ylli Demneri
One out of ten by Laert Vasili at MESS
Project Ilion-Work in Progress by Laert Vasili

Translator
He has translated several plays from English into Greek and Albanian, and also from Greek into Albanian.

Filmography
 The Miracle of th Sargasso Sea
 The Invocation of Enver Simaku
 Menge Kemishe
 Paftuar
 Ειμαρμένη
 Agon
 Out of touch
 Balkan Bazaar
 Red Sky
 Charlie's Son
 Hostage
 Playing Parts
 Alexandreia
 Tomorrow Is Another Day
 Annas Somer
 Edge of Night
 See You
 Flegomeni Stella

Television
 Skanderbeg
 Oikos antohis
 Oi istories tou astynomou Beka
 I agapi irthe apo makria
 Gia tin Anna
 Ta mystika tis Edem
 Kato Partali
 Three at TIFF
 Αγνώστου Διαμονής 
 Ω Γλυκύ μου Έαρ
 Στον Ήλιο του Αιγαίου
 Η λίμνη των στεναγμών
 Αίθουσα Αναμονής
 Αγία τετράδα
 Ελληνοαλβανικό Συναξάρι
 Tingulli i Heshtjes

Theatre
He has collaborated with directors such as: Theodoros Terzopoulos, Robert Wilson, Anatoly Vasiliev, Tadashi Suzuki, Dimiter Gotscheff, Andrew Visnevski, Aleksandar Popovski and also with Greek directors: Antonis Antypas, George Kimoulis, Dimitris Mavrikios, Yiannis Kakleas, Roula Pateraki, Maya Limperopoulou, Sylvia Liouliou etc.
He was nominated for Dimitris Horn Prize (Best Young Actor 2001).

Blind Taste
He was the winner of the first season of the reality show Blind Taste presented by Vizion Plus TV in Tirana, Albania. He came first at the grand finale on 4 July 2015 besting 32 candidates.

Dance With Me
He was part of the first season of the reality show Dance with Me presented by Klan TV in Tirana that was held between 28 September and 29 December 2014. The couple of the actor and the professional singer Zajmina Vasjari came second of six competing couples at the finale.

References

 Laertis Vasiliou at BBC
 Laertis Vasiliou at BBC Newsnight
 Laertis Vasiliou at Reuters
 Laertis Vasiliou at Out
 Laertis Vasiliou at El País
 Laertis Vasiliou at VICE
 Laertis Vasiliou at NPR
 Laertis Vasiliou at CBC News
 Laertis Vasiliou at RTÉ
 Laertis Vasiliou at IBTimes
 Laertis Vasiliou at La Stampa
 Laertis Vasiliou at ILGA-Europe
 Laertis Vasiliou at La Vanguardia
 Laertis Vasiliou at Americans United
 Laertis Vasiliou at Broadway Worldwide 
 Laert Vasili at National Theatre of Northern Greece
 The Parthenon Post
 The Pappas Post
 Artist Direct
 LiveMovies
 RedSky
 Altcine
 Laert Vasili at Tirana Times
 Laert Vasili at Mapo

External links
 Laert Vasili at YouTube
 Laert Vasili at Panorama
 Laert Vasili at DailyMotion
 Laert Vasili at CLASS
 Laert Vasili at YouTube

1974 births
Living people
People from Delvinë
Greek male film actors
University of Arts (Albania) alumni
Albanian emigrants to Greece
Greek people of Albanian descent